The discography of King Diamond, a Danish heavy metal band, consists of twelve studio releases, three live albums, five compilations, six singles, and four music videos. King Diamond was formed in 1985, after the dissolution of the group Mercyful Fate, by vocalist King Diamond, guitarists Andy LaRocque and Michael Denner, bassist Timi Hansen, and drummer Mikkey Dee. The following year, the band released their debut album Fatal Portrait, which charted at number 33 in Sweden. King Diamond's second studio album, Abigail, was released on 24 February 1987 and reached number 123 in the US, number 39 in Sweden and number 68 in the Netherlands. Following some line-up changes, the group released the album "Them" in 1988, which peaked at number 38 in Sweden, number 65 in the Netherlands, and at number 89 in the US, making "Them" King Diamond's highest-charting album in North America. The following year, the band released the follow-up album Conspiracy, which charted at number 111 in North America, number 41 in Sweden and at number 64 in the Netherlands. In 1990, after more line-up changes, King Diamond released the album The Eye, which only charted at number 179 in the US, which makes The Eye King Diamond's lowest-charting album in North America.

After Mercyful Fate was reformed in 1993, King Diamond remained inactive until 1995, when the band released the album The Spider's Lullabye with the line-up of King Diamond, Andy LaRocque, guitarist Herb Simonsen, bassist Chris Estes and drummer Darrin Anthony. The album went on to reach number 31 in Finland. The Spider's Lullabye was followed by The Graveyard (number 23 in Finland) and Voodoo (number 27 in Finland, number 55 in the Netherlands) in 1996 and 1998 respectively. In 2000, King Diamond released the album House of God, which peaked at number 60 in Sweden. After the release of 2002's Abigail II: The Revenge, which peaked at number 42 in Sweden and at number 24 in Finland, King Diamond's line-up has remained stable to this day, consisting of King Diamond, Andy LaRocque, bassist Hal Patino, guitarist Mike Wead and drummer Matt Thompson. In 2003, the band released The Puppet Master, which reached number 36 in Sweden. In 2007, King Diamond released their 12th studio album Give Me Your Soul...Please, which peaked at 174 in the US, number 28 in Sweden and at number 25 in Finland.

Albums

Studio albums

Live albums

Compilation albums

Extended plays

Singles

Music videos

References 

Heavy metal group discographies
Discographies of Danish artists